Kutilovo is a rural locality (a selo) in Maksimovsky Selsoviet of Oktyabrsky District, Amur Oblast, Russia. The population was 47 as of 2018. There is 1 street.

Geography 
Kutilovo is located on the Dim River, 41 km southwest of Yekaterinoslavka (the district's administrative centre) by road. Maximovka is the nearest rural locality.

References 

Rural localities in Oktyabrsky District, Amur Oblast